Supreme National Security Council (SNSC;  Showrāye Āliye Amniyate Mellī also Supreme Council for National Security) is the national security council of the Islamic Republic of Iran, the current secretary of the Supreme National Security Council of which is Rear Admiral Upper Half Ali Shamkhani. He was appointed to position of secretary by the Supreme Leader Ali Khamenei On 10 September 2013. 
The council was formed for the protection and support of national interests and Islamic revolution and territorial integrity and national sovereignty of the country. This institution was founded during the 1989 revision of the constitution.

The responsibilities of the council are defined by the constitution as: 
 Determining the defense and national security policies of the country within the framework of general policies determined by the Leader. 
 Coordination of political activities, intelligence, social, cultural and economic fields relating to general policies of defense and national security. 
 Exploitation of material and intellectual resources of the country for facing the internal and external threats.

Composition
This National Security Council is mandated by Article 176 of the Constitution of the Islamic Republic of Iran to be presided over by the president of the country.  The Supreme Leader Ali Khamenei selects the secretary of the Supreme council. The decisions of the Council are effective after the confirmation by the Supreme Leader. Supreme Leader Ali Khamenei and the Supreme National Security Council (SNSC) are at the top of the foreign policy decisions process.

Nuclear policy
Supreme National Security Council formulates the country's nuclear policy. The nuclear policies formulated by the council would become effective if they are confirmed by the Supreme Leader. The secretary of the Supreme council was the chief nuclear negotiator of Iran until 5 September 2013 when responsibility for nuclear talks was assigned to the ministry of foreign affairs.

List of Secretaries

Members
As of 2021, following members are:

References and notes

Further reading
 Wege, Carl Anthony. "Iranian intelligence organizations." International Journal of Intelligence and CounterIntelligence 10.3 (1997): 287-298.
 Wege, Carl Anthony. "Iranian Counterintelligence." International Journal of Intelligence and CounterIntelligence 32.2 (2019): 272-294.

External links

Supreme Defense Council (SDC)
Iran’s President Criticized Over Nuclear Issue

Politics of Iran
Government agencies of Iran
Iran
Public policy in Iran
Foreign relations of Iran